Johann-Erasmus Georg Adalbert Freiherr von Malsen-Ponickau (5 June 1895 – 12 June 1956) was a German Nazi SS-Brigadeführer and Police President in several German cities. During the Second World War, he served as the SS and Police Leader in Istria. Following the war, he was imprisoned for seven years in Poland.

Early life 
Malsen-Polnickau was born in Munich, the son of Theobald Freiherr von Malsen (1867–1930), a nobleman and officer in the Royal Bavarian Army and his wife, also of noble birth, née Johanna Olga Freiin von Ponickau (1873–1940). He attended volksschule in Munich, followed by gymnasium in Landau and a military academy in Karlsruhe through 1912. This was followed by two years at the elite Preußische Hauptkadettenanstalt (Prussian Main Cadet Institute) in Lichterfelde. 
In September 1914 shortly after the outbreak of the First World War, Malsen-Polnickau was commissioned a Leutnant in the 20th (1st Baden) Life Dragoon Regiment of the German Imperial Army. He saw combat on both the eastern and western fronts, and was awarded the Iron Cross, 2nd class. From April 1915 to July 1918, he was commander of a machine gun platoon. From July to the end of the war in November 1918, he was an orderly officer and adjutant in the 215th Infantry Regiment.  He returned to Germany in January 1919 and remained at garrison duty in Karlsruhe until being discharged from the service in April 1919 with the rank of Oberleutnant. 

Malsen-Polnickau then became  active in the German veterans organization, Der Stahlhelm. From April to June 1919, he served with the Freikorps Epp, a right-wing paramilitary unit that took part in the suppression of the Bavarian Soviet Republic. He then undertook a one-year agriculture and forestry internship in Munich and Hohenheim and became a member of the Corps Rheno-Palatia, a German Student Corps. He went on to manage the family estate, Schloss Osterberg in Swabia, from 1922.

Peacetime SS career 
Malsen-Ponickau had joined the Nazi Party sometime in 1922, leaving it after the failed Beer Hall Putsch of November 1923. He rejoined the Party (membership number 213,542) on 1 March 1930. At that time, he was appointed Ortsgruppenleiter (Local Group Leader) in Niederraunau where he served through July 1932. He joined the SS (SS number 3,914) on 27 November 1930. Assigned to the 29th SS-Standarte in Niederraunau, he became its first leader on 18 January 1931, and was commissioned an SS-Sturmführer on 1 February 1931. After further promotions, on 11 August 1932 he advanced to the command of the prestigious First SS-Abschnitt in Munich, the headquarters of the Nazi Party, where he oversaw nine SS-Standarten.

After the Nazi seizure of power, Malsen-Ponickau was transferred to the command of SS-Abschnitt IX in Nuremberg on 20 April 1933 and also became acting chief of police in Nuremberg-Fürth. After a conflict with Nuremberg Gauleiter Julius Streicher, Malsen-Ponickau was recalled from his posts and transferred to the staff of Reichsfuhrer-SS Heinrich Himmler on 15 August 1933.  Although promoted to SS-Brigadeführer that same date, this would be his last promotion, and he remained the senior-most holder of this rank. He was next assigned from 15 January 1934 to 20 September 1936 as the commander of SS-Abschnitt X with headquarters in Stuttgart. He sought election to the Reichstag in March 1936 and April 1938, but did not receive a mandate. In March 1936 he also joined the 18th Cavalry Regiment in Bad Cannstatt as an Oberleutnant of reserves and was promoted to Rittmeister of reserves on 1 March 1938. In April 1938 he was transferred to become the Acting Police Director in Frankfurt (Oder), and this appointment was made permanent in March 1939.

Second World War 
Malsen-Ponickau remained in Frankfurt until 31 May 1940 when he was named Police President of Posen (today, Poznań) in the Reichsgau Wartheland which had been annexed from Poland. He also headed the Kriminalpolizei (KriPo) there. On 28 June 1943 he was transferred to Halle (Saale) where he also served as Police President and KriPo commander until 20 December. From February 1944, Malsen-Ponickau was Himmler's Besonderer Vertreter (special representative) to the Higher SS and Police Leader (HSSPF) of the Operational Zone of the Adriatic Littoral, SS-Gruppenführer Odilo Globocnik, in Trieste. On 27 October 1944 he was named SS and Polizeigebietkommandeur (Police Area Commander) "Istrien" with his seat in Pola (today, Pula). He remained in this post until the end of the war in Europe.

After the end of the war, Malsen-Ponickau was taken prisoner by the Americans and extradited to Poland in 1946, where he was put on trial. He was acquitted of war crimes, but received a 7-year sentence for being a member of the SS, which had been deemed a criminal organization by the International Military Tribunal. After his release, Malsen-Ponickau returned to Munich, where he lived until his death.

SS ranks

References

Sources

External links 
 Malsen-Ponichau in Joachim Lilla: Ministers of State, Senior Administrative Officials and (NS) Officials in Bavaria from 1918 to 1945

1895 births
1956 deaths
Barons of Germany
German people imprisoned abroad
German police chiefs
Knights of the Order of St John
Nazi Party officials
Nobility in the Nazi Party
People from Munich
People indicted for war crimes
Nazis convicted of crimes
Recipients of the Iron Cross (1914), 2nd class
SS and Police Leaders
SS-Brigadeführer
20th-century Freikorps personnel
German Army personnel of World War I
German prisoners of war in World War II held by the United States
Prisoners and detainees of Poland